The Enquirer-Gazette is a weekly newspaper published in Upper Marlboro, Maryland. It was founded on January 30, 1925, when Frederick Sasscer, Jr. and his partner Samuel A. Wyvill purchased the Marlboro Gazette from Mary and Charles Wilson, combining it with the paper they previously owned, the Prince George's Enquirer and Southern Maryland Advertiser. Sasscer remained editor of the Enquirer-Gazette until his death in 1929.

The paper continues to be published, with the Adams Publishing Group as publisher and Jim Normandin acting as president. Editor: Joy Tyler </ref>

References 

Prince George's County, Maryland
Newspapers published in Maryland
Weekly newspapers published in the United States
1925 establishments in Maryland